The Bluebells is a five-song EP, or mini-album as it states on the record, by Scottish indie new wave band The Bluebells, released in 1983 by Sire Records. It was only released in the US and Canada in order to showcase singles released in the UK.

Reception 
The album was reviewed in Billboard: "This young quintet makes its five-track debut a celebration of the pop virtues of '60s Merseybeat, with ringing guitars, harmonica and fresh vocal harmonies the order of the day. The thrust is on romantic rock, although the group also offers an earnest new version of [Dominic] Behan's "Patriots Game", a clear-eyed lament for the unceasing turmoil in Ireland."

Track listing

Personnel 
The Bluebells
 Robert Hodgens – vocals, guitar
 David McCluskey – vocals, guitar, drums
 Russell Irvine – lead guitar
 Lawrence Donegan – bass guitar
 Kenneth McCluskey – vocals, mouth organ, flageolet
Technical
Fraser Taylor – illustration
Paul Cox – photography
Simon Halfon, Robert Hodgens – design

References 

1983 debut EPs
Sire Records EPs
The Bluebells albums